The Sloping Island Group is a group of small islands in south-eastern Tasmania in Australia.
They lie close to the south-eastern coast of Tasmania around the Tasman and Forestier Peninsulas.

The group consists of:
 Sloping Island
 Barren Island
 Fulham Island
 Hog Island
 King George Island
 Smooth Island
 Spectacle Island
 Little Spectacle Island
 Visscher Island
 Woody Island

References

 
Islands of South East Tasmania
Protected areas of Tasmania